The Baptism of Christ is an oil on canvas painting by Peter Paul Rubens, executed in 1604–1605. It depicts John the Baptist baptizing Jesus Christ in the Jordan river. The painting is owned by the Royal Museum of Fine Arts Antwerp.

References

1605 paintings
Paintings by Peter Paul Rubens